Animal Bag was an alternative metal grunge band from Charlotte, North Carolina, United States, which was active from 1987 through 1998.

Career
After some personnel changes, the band congealed around members Luke Edwards (vocals and guitar), Rich Parris (guitars, mandolin, and vocals), Otis Hughes (bass guitar), and Boo Duckworth (drums and percussion) in 1987. After building a following in their native North Carolina, the group relocated to Los Angeles in 1989.

Favorable press in newspapers including the L.A. Music Scene, which compared them to the Red Hot Chili Peppers and Faith No More, coupled with the exploding alternative music scene, brought the band to the attention of several A&R execs, and Animal Bag was eventually signed to Mercury records in 1992.

Their 1992 self-titled initial release mixed acoustic and electric rock and Animal Bag was prominently featured in the pilot episode of My So-Called Life as the party band. The album's first single, Everybody, peaked briefly at No. 29 on the Billboard Mainstream Rock chart in 1993, and was a minor success in Japan, hitting No. 32 for 8 weeks in March 1993. Their follow-up 1994 album Offering was all-acoustic and did not chart well in the U.S. Mercury was willing to give the band one more chance, and brought in producer Terry Date to helm a return to harder-edged music for the band's 1996 album Image Damage. The album was never released because of inner shakeups at the record label; most of the people who had worked the first two Animal Bag releases left the label.

Discography
Albums/EPs
Animal Bag LP (1992)
Offering EP (1994)
Image Damage LP (1995) (Never officially released)
Misc Recordings EP (1998)

Singles

References

External links
 official music video for Animal Bag's first single Everybody

Rock music groups from North Carolina
1987 establishments in North Carolina
Musical groups established in 1987
Musical groups disestablished in 1998
Mercury Records artists